Sumter County is a county located in the west central portion of Alabama. At the 2020 census, the population was 12,345. Its county seat is Livingston. Its name is in honor of General Thomas Sumter of South Carolina.

History
Sumter County was established on December 18, 1832. From 1797 to 1832, Sumter County was part of the Choctaw Nation, which was made up of four main villages. The first settlers in Sumter County were French explorers who had come north from Mobile. They built and settled at Fort Tombecbee, near the modern-day town of Epes. In 1830, with the Treaty of Dancing Rabbit Creek, the Choctaw Indians ceded the land that is now Sumter County to the government.

Geography
It is intersected by the Noxubee River.

Major highways
  Interstate 20
  Interstate 59
  U.S. Route 11
  U.S. Route 80
  State Route 17
  State Route 28
  State Route 39
  State Route 116

Adjacent counties
 Pickens County (north)
 Greene County (northeast)
 Marengo County (southeast)
 Choctaw County (south)
 Lauderdale County, Mississippi (southwest)
 Kemper County, Mississippi (west)
 Noxubee County, Mississippi (northwest)

Demographics

2020 census

As of the 2020 United States census, there were 12,345 people, 5,202 households, and 2,764 families residing in the county.

2010 census
At the 2010 United States census, 13,763 people resided in the county. About 75.0% were Black or African American, 24.2% White, 0.2% Asian, 0.1% Native American, 0.2% of some other race, and 0.3% of two or more races; 0.6% were Hispanic or Latino (of any race).

2000 census
At the 2000 census, 14,798 people, 5,708 households and 3,664 families resided there. The population density was 16 per square mile (6.2 per square kilometre). The 6,953 housing units averaged . The racial make-up was 25.92% White, 73.17% Black or African American, 0.09% Native American, 0.10% Asian, 0.01% Pacific Islander, 0.18% from other races and 0.52% from two or more races. Nearly 1.12% of the population was Hispanic or Latino.

Of the 5,708 households, 31.90% had children under the age of 18 living with them, 36.70% were married couples living together, 23.50% had a female householder with no husband present, and 35.80% were not families. About 31.20% of all households were made up of individuals, and 12.30% had someone living alone who was 65 years of age or older. The average household size was 2.55, and the average family size was 3.26.

29.10% of the population were under the age of 18, 12.20% from 18 to 24, 25.30% from 25 to 44, 19.50% from 45 to 64, and 13.90% who were 65 years of age or older.  The median age was 32 years. For every 100 females, there were 84.90 males. For every 100 females age 18 and over, there were 78.20 males.

The median household income was $18,911 and the median family income was $23,176. Males had a median income of $28,059 and females $17,574. The per capita income was $11,491. About 32.90% of families and 38.70% of the population were below the poverty line, including 47.40% of those under age 18 and 36.10% of those age 65 or over.

Economy
Sumter County is part of the so-called Black Belt region of central Alabama.

The plant would require 250 workers to construct in a town of only 206. Up to 235 full-time jobs would be created when completed, with jobs paying about $50,000 annually. The state of Alabama offered $28 million in incentives to get the plant located in Sumter County. The plant would make use of a new technology that produces a carbon alloy for use in steel making at the U.S. Steel plant in Fairfield, Alabama near Birmingham. 
At the time of the announcement, the unemployment rate in Sumter County was 6.1%.

In November 2008, U.S. Steel spokesman D. John Armstrong announced that plans to build the Epes facility had been placed on hold.  “We’ve adjusted the timing of it, and we don’t know what the new timeline will be,” he said. “We’ve delayed construction, but we have not cancelled it.“

To date, the Epes facility has not been built.

From 2009 to 2013, the county had a median household income of $22,186 compared to a state figure of $45,253, making it the poorest county in the state. By 2015, Sumter County remained the poorest county in Alabama, with a median household income of $19,501 in comparison to the state median household income of $43,623.

Education

Colleges and universities
The University of West Alabama is in Livingston.

Primary and secondary schools
The school district serving the county is Sumter County School District.

Until 2017, all schools in Sumter County were in practice entirely racially segregated, as white parents sent their children to Sumter Academy, a private segregation academy set up in 1970 in the wake of a federal court ruling ordering the school district to desegregate. During the 2015–16 school year, 98% of the 1,593 students in county's public schools were black, while none of the 170 students at Sumter Academy were black. However, Sumter Academy closed in June 2017, while in August 2018, University Charter School opened, with a half-black, half-white enrollment, making it the county's first practically desegregated school.

Government
Sumter has long been solidly Democratic, having voted in presidential elections for a Republican only once this past century.

Communities

Cities
 Livingston (county seat)
 York

Towns
 Cuba
 Emelle
 Epes
 Gainesville
 Geiger

Census-designated places
 Bellamy
 Panola

Unincorporated communities
 Belmont
 Coatopa
 Intercourse
 Sumterville
 Ward
 Warsaw

Places of interest
Sumter County is home to the University of West Alabama Outdoor Sculpture Exhibition and the Coleman Center for the Arts.  The historic Alamuchee-Bellamy Covered Bridge is also located on the University of West Alabama campus.

Notable residents
 Carol Forman, actress
 Amelia Greenwald, International nurse, and first female driver in Poland

See also
 National Register of Historic Places listings in Sumter County, Alabama
 Properties on the Alabama Register of Landmarks and Heritage in Sumter County, Alabama

References

External links
 2007 map of Sumter County showing roads and settlements by University of Alabama Department of Geography.

 
Black Belt (U.S. region)
1832 establishments in Alabama
Populated places established in 1832
Majority-minority counties in Alabama